Björgólfur may refer to:

Björgólfur Guðmundsson (born 1941), the chairman and former owner of West Ham United FC
Björgólfur Hideaki Takefusa (born 1980), Icelandic football forward of Japanese descent
Björgólfur Thor Björgólfsson (born 1967), Icelandic businessman and entrepreneur

Icelandic masculine given names